John Raymond Brosnan (7 October 1947 – 11 April 2005) was an Australian writer of both fiction and non-fiction works in the fantasy and science fiction genres. He was born in Perth, Western Australia, and died in South Harrow, London, from acute pancreatitis. He sometimes published under the pseudonyms Harry Adam Knight, Simon Ian Childer (both sometimes used together with Leroy Kettle), James Blackstone (used together with John Baxter), and John Raymond. Three movies were based on his novels–Beyond Bedlam (aka Nightscare), Proteus (based on Slimer), and Carnosaur. In addition to science fiction, he also wrote a number of books about cinema and was a regular columnist with the popular UK magazine Starburst and comic  2000 AD. Liverpool University holds a collection of his work consisting of both published material and drafts.

Bibliography

Science fiction

Series 
 Sky Lords series
 The Sky Lords (1988)
 The War of the Sky Lords (1989)
 The Fall of the Sky Lords (1991)
 Damned and Fancy series
 Damned and Fancy (1995)
 Have Demon, Will Travel (1996)
 Mothership series
 Mothership (2004)
 Mothership Awakening (2005)

Novels 
 As John Brosnan
 Skyship (1981)
 The Midas Deep (1983)
 The Opoponax Invasion (1993)
 As James Blackstone with John Baxter
 Torched (1986)
 As Harry Adam Knight with Leroy Kettle
 Slimer (1983)
 The Fungus (1985) (re-released in 1990 as Death Spore)
 Bedlam (1992)
 As Simon Ian Childer with Leroy Kettle
 Tendrils (1986)
 As Harry Adam Knight
 Carnosaur (1984)
 As Simon Ian Childer
 Worm (1988)

Short stories 
 Junk Shop (published in SF Digest, 1976)
 Conversation on a Starship in Warp-Drive (1975)
 An Eye in Paradise
 The One and Only Tale from The White Horse

TV novelisations 
 Bulman series (as John Raymond)
 Thin Ice (1987)
 Prospects series (as John Raymond)
 Dirty Weekend (1986)
 Partners in Brine (1986)

Humour 
 The Dirty Movie Book (1988) with Leroy Kettle (as Leroy Mitchell)

Non-fiction 
 James Bond in the Cinema (1972)
 Movie Magic: The Story of Special Effects in the Cinema (1974)
 The Horror People (1976)
 Future Tense: The Cinema of Science Fiction (1978)
 James Bond for Your 007 Eyes Only (1981) (with Tony Crawley)
 The Primal Screen: A History of Science Fiction Film (1991)
 Hollywood Babble On (1998)
 Lights, Camera, Magic! (1998)
 Scream: The Unofficial Guide to the Scream Trilogy (2000)

Comics

2000 AD 
 Night Zero (with Kev Hopgood):
 "Night Zero" (in 2000 AD #607-616, December 1988 - March 1989)
 "Beyond Zero" (in 2000 AD #630-634, 645-649 and 665-666, June 1989 - February 1990)
 "Lost in Zero" (in 2000 AD Annual 1991, September 1990)
 "Below Zero" (in 2000 AD #731-745, May–August 1991)

References

External links
 
 John Brosnan at Fantastic Fiction
 
 Torching John Brosnan by Dave Langford

1947 births
2005 deaths
20th-century Australian novelists
20th-century Australian male writers
21st-century Australian novelists
Australian comics writers
Australian male novelists
20th-century Australian non-fiction writers
Australian science fiction writers
Australian male short story writers
Deaths from pancreatitis
People from South Harrow
Writers from Perth, Western Australia
20th-century Australian short story writers
21st-century Australian short story writers
21st-century Australian male writers